Chah Bahar, in Markazi Province, may refer to:
 Chah Bahar, Komijan
 Chah Bahar, Saveh